The 2016–17 Arizona State Sun Devils women's basketball team represented Arizona State University during the 2016–17 NCAA Division I women's basketball season. The Sun Devils, led by 20th year head coach Charli Turner Thorne, played their games at the Wells Fargo Arena and were members of the Pac-12 Conference. They finished the season 20–13, 9–9 in Pac-12 play to finish in fifth place. They advanced to the quarterfinals of the Pac-12 women's tournament where they lost to UCLA. They received at-large bid of the NCAA women's tournament where they defeated Michigan State in the first round before losing to South Carolina in the second round.

Roster

Schedule

|-
!colspan=9 style="background:#990033; color:#FFB310;"| Non-conference regular season

|-
!colspan=9 style="background:#990033; color:#FFB310;"| Pac-12 regular season

|-
!colspan=9 style="background:#990033;"| Pac-12 Women's Tournament

|-
!colspan=9 style="background:#990033;"| NCAA Women's Tournament

Rankings
2016–17 NCAA Division I women's basketball rankings

See also
2016–17 Arizona State Sun Devils men's basketball team

References

Arizona State Sun Devils women's basketball seasons
Arizona State
Arizona State Sun Devils women's basketball
Arizona State Sun Devils women's basketball
Arizona State